"Whatever U Want" is a song by American singer Christina Milian. It was written by Bradley Spalter, Lambert Waldrip II, Aleese Simmons, Andre Mortion, Khaleef Chiles, James Banks, and Henderson Thigpen and produced by Bradley & Stereo for Milian's second album, It's About Time (2004), featuring a rap verse by rapper Joe Budden. The song was released as the album's second and final single on September 20, 2004. 

In contrast to its predecessor, "Dip It Low", the single saw moderate success, peaking at number 100 on the Billboard Hot 100. Outside of the United States, "Whatever U Want" achieved a similar lack of success in most countries with the exception of the United Kingdom, where the song peaked within the top 10 of the UK Singles Chart and topped the UK R&B Singles Chart.

Track listings

UK CD1
 "Whatever U Want" (radio version)
 "Whatever U Want" (radio version without rap)

UK CD2
 "Whatever U Want" (radio version)
 "Whatever U Want" (DJ Cipha Sounds remix)
 "Whatever U Want" (JJ Flores Old Skool radio)
 "Whatever U Want" (Kriya & Velez radio edit)
 "Whatever U Want" (Roy Davis & Tomi Deep soul remix)
 "Whatever U Want" (video)

European CD single
 "Whatever U Want" (featuring Joe Budden)
 "Whatever U Want" (JJ Flores Old Skool extended mix)

European maxi-CD single
 "Whatever U Want" (featuring Joe Budden)
 "Whatever U Want" (Jack D. Elliot Amped remix)
 "Whatever U Want" (DJ Cipha Sounds remix)
 "Whatever U Want" (video)

Charts

Weekly charts

Year-end charts

Release history

References

2004 singles
2004 songs
Christina Milian songs
Def Jam Recordings singles
Island Records singles
Joe Budden songs
Music videos directed by Ray Kay